Henry Preston was a first-class cricketer.

Henry Preston may also refer to:
 Sir Henry Preston, 3rd Baronet (1851–1897), English soldier, magistrate and footballer
 Henry Preston (antiquary) (1852-1940), geologist, archaeologist and numismatist, founder of Grantham Museum
 Henry Preston (MP for Nottingham), 1414–1417, MP for Nottingham
 Henry Preston (died 1434), MP for City of York

See also
 Harry Preston (disambiguation)